The Russian First League 1995 was the 4th edition of Russian First Division. It was the first season when 3 points were awarded for a win.

Overview

Standings

Top goalscorers 

29 goals

 Sergei Bulatov (FC Baltika Kaliningrad)

28 goals

 Sergei Toporov (FC Zarya Leninsk-Kuznetsky)

21 goals

 Mikhail Potylchak (FC Torpedo Volzhsky)

19 goals

 Vladimir Kulik (FC Zenit St. Petersburg)

18 goals

 Eduard Bogdanov (FC Uralan Elista)
 Nail Galimov (FC Lokomotiv Chita)
 Rustyam Fakhrutdinov (FC Neftekhimik Nizhnekamsk)
  Karapet Mikaelyan (FC Zvezda Irkutsk)

16 goals

 Ayrat Akhmetgaliyev (FC Neftekhimik Nizhnekamsk)
 Oleg Rydny (FC Dynamo Stavropol)
 Aleksandr Selenkov (FC Luch Vladivostok)

See also
Russian Top League 1995
Russian Second League 1995
Russian Third League 1995

2
Russian First League seasons
Russia
Russia